"" ("I am a Berliner") is a speech by United States President John F. Kennedy given on June 26, 1963, in West Berlin. It is one of the best-known speeches of the Cold War and among the most famous anti-communist speeches.

Twenty-two months earlier, East Germany had erected the Berlin Wall to prevent mass emigration to West Berlin. The speech was aimed as much at the Soviet Union as it was at West Berliners. Another phrase in the speech was also spoken in German, "Lasst sie nach Berlin kommen" ("Let them come to Berlin"), addressed at those who claimed "we can work with the Communists", a remark at which Nikita Khrushchev scoffed only days later.

The speech is considered one of Kennedy's finest, delivered at the height of the Cold War and the New Frontier. It was a great morale boost for West Berliners, who lived in an enclave deep inside East Germany and feared a possible East German occupation.

Speaking to an audience of 120,000 on the steps of Rathaus Schöneberg, Kennedy said,

Kennedy used the phrase twice in his speech, including at the end, pronouncing the sentence with his Boston accent and reading from his note "ish bin ein Bearleener", which he had written out using English orthography to approximate the German pronunciation.

For decades, competing claims about the origins of the "Ich bin ein Berliner" overshadowed the history of the speech. In 2008, historian Andreas Daum provided a comprehensive explanation, based on archival sources and interviews with contemporaries and witnesses. He highlighted the authorship of Kennedy himself and his 1962 speech in New Orleans as a precedent, and demonstrated that by straying from the prepared script in Berlin, Kennedy created the climax of an emotionally charged political performance, which became a hallmark of the Cold War epoch.

There is a widespread misconception that Kennedy accidentally said that he was a Berliner, a German doughnut specialty. This is an urban legend which emerged several decades after the speech, and it is not true that residents of Berlin in 1963 would have mainly understood the word "Berliner" to refer to a jelly doughnut or that the audience laughed at Kennedy's use of this expression.

Background

Germany's capital, Berlin, was deep within the area controlled by the Soviet Union after World War II. Initially governed in four sectors controlled by the four Allied powers (United States, United Kingdom, France and the Soviet Union), tensions of the Cold War escalated until the Soviet forces implemented the Berlin Blockade of the city's western sectors, which the Western allies relieved with the dramatic airlift. Afterward, the sectors controlled by the NATO Allies became an effective exclave of West Germany, completely surrounded by East Germany. Starting in 1952, the border between East and West was closed everywhere but in Berlin. Hundreds of thousands of East Germans defected to the West via West Berlin, a labour drain that threatened East Germany with economic collapse.

In 1961, the East German government under Walter Ulbricht erected a barbed-wire barrier around West Berlin, officially called the antifaschistischer Schutzwall (anti-fascist protective barrier). The East German authorities argued that it was meant to prevent spies and agents of West Germany from crossing into the East. However, it was universally known as the Berlin Wall and its real purpose was to keep East German citizens from escaping to the West. Over a period of months the wall was rebuilt using concrete, and buildings were demolished to create a "death zone" in view of East German guards armed with machine guns. The Wall closed the biggest loophole in the Iron Curtain, and Berlin went from being one of the easiest places to cross from East Europe to West Europe to being one of the most difficult.

The West, including the U.S., was accused of failing to respond forcefully to the erection of the Wall. Officially, Berlin was under joint occupation by the four allied powers, each with primary responsibility for a certain zone. Kennedy's speech marked the first instance where the U.S. acknowledged that East Berlin was part of the Soviet bloc along with the rest of East Germany. On July 25, 1961, Kennedy insisted in a presidential address that the U.S. would defend West Berlin, asserting its Four-Power rights, while making it clear that challenging the Soviet presence in Germany was not possible.

Genesis and execution of the speech

Origins

The Ich bin ein Berliner speech is in part derived from a speech Kennedy gave at a Civic Reception on May 4, 1962, in New Orleans; there also he used the phrase civis Romanus sum by saying "Two thousand years ago the proudest boast was to say, "I am a citizen of Rome." Today, I believe, in 1962 the proudest boast is to say, "I am a citizen of the United States." And it is not enough to merely say it; we must live it. Anyone can say it. But Americans who serve today in West Berlin—your sons and brothers—[...] are the Americans who are bearing the great burden." The phrases "I am a Berliner" and "I am proud to be in Berlin" were typed already a week before the speech on a list of expressions to be used, including a phonetic transcription of the German translation. Such transcriptions are also found in the third draft of the speech (in Kennedy's own handwriting), from June 25. The final typed version of the speech does not contain the transcriptions, which are added by hand by Kennedy himself.

In practice sessions before the trip, Kennedy had run through a number of sentences, even paragraphs, to recite in German; in these sessions, he was helped by Margaret Plischke, a translator working for the US State Department; by Ted Sorensen, Kennedy's counsel and habitual speechwriter; and by an interpreter, Robert Lochner, who had grown up in Berlin. It became clear quickly that the president did not have a gift for languages and was more likely to embarrass himself if he were to cite in German for any length.

But there are differing accounts on the origin of the phrase Ich bin ein Berliner. Plischke wrote a 1997 account of visiting Kennedy at the White House weeks before the trip to help compose the speech and teach him the proper pronunciation; she also claims that the phrase had been translated stateside already by the translator scheduled to accompany him on the trip ("a rather unpleasant man who complained bitterly that he had had to interrupt his vacation just to watch the President’s mannerisms"). Additionally, Ted Sorensen claimed in his memoir Counselor: A Life at the Edge of History (2008) to have had a hand in the speech, and said he had incorrectly inserted the word ein, incorrectly taking responsibility for the "jelly doughnut misconception", below, a claim apparently supported by Berlin mayor Willy Brandt but dismissed by later scholars since the final typed version, which does not contain the words, is the last one Sorensen could have worked on. Robert Lochner claimed in his memoirs that Kennedy had asked him for a translation of "I am a Berliner", and that they practiced the phrase in Brandt's office. Daum credited  the origin of the phrase Ich bin ein Berliner to Kennedy and his 1962 speech in New Orleans quoted above. According to Daum, Kennedy was affected by seeing the Berlin Wall, so that he "falls back on the most memorable passage of his New Orleans speech given the year before, changing pride in being an American in being a Berliner."

Delivery

Behind the long table set up on the steps of the Rathaus Schöneberg were U.S. and German dignitaries, including Dean Rusk (Kennedy's Secretary of State), Lucius D. Clay (the former US administrator of Germany), Konrad Adenauer (the German chancellor), Willy Brandt, the Mayor of Berlin and Otto Bach (President of the Abgeordnetenhaus of Berlin). The crowd was estimated at 450,000 people. Bach spoke first, of the recent developments in Berlin, especially the wall. He was followed by Konrad Adenauer, who spoke briefly and introduced the president.

Kennedy was accompanied not by Robert Lochner, but by Heinz Weber of the Berlin mission; Weber translated the president's speech to the audience. Besides the typescript, Kennedy had a cue card on which he himself had written the phonetic spelling, and he surprised everyone by completely disregarding the speech, which had taken weeks to prepare. Instead, he improvised: "He says more than he should, something different from what his advisers had recommended, and is more provocative than he had intended to be."

The speech culminated with the second use in the speech of the Ich bin ein Berliner phrase: "Today, in the world of freedom, the proudest boast is Ich bin ein Berliner!" The crowd was quiet while Weber translated and repeated the president's German line; Kennedy was obviously relieved at the crowd's positive response and thanked Weber for his translation. Weber translated this compliment also. According to Daum, after this first successful delivery, "Kennedy, who fiddles a bit with his suit jacket, is grinning like a boy who has just pulled off a coup."

Kennedy's National Security Advisor McGeorge Bundy thought the speech had gone "a little too far", and the two revised the text of a second major speech scheduled at the Freie Universität Berlin later that day for a softer stance which "amounted to being a bit more conciliatory toward the Soviets."

Consequences and legacy

While the immediate response from the West German population was positive, the Soviet authorities were less pleased with the combative Lasst sie nach Berlin kommen. Only two weeks before, in his American University speech (formally titled "A Strategy of Peace"), Kennedy had spoken in a more conciliatory tone, speaking of "improving relations with the Soviet Union": in response to Kennedy's Berlin speech, Nikita Khrushchev, days later, remarked that "one would think that the speeches were made by two different Presidents."

Ronald Reagan would evoke both the sentiment and the legacy of Kennedy's speech 24 years later in his "Tear down this wall!" speech.

There are commemorative sites to Kennedy in Berlin, such as the German-American John F. Kennedy School and the John F. Kennedy-Institute for North American Studies of the FU Berlin. The public square in front of the Rathaus Schöneberg was renamed John-F.-Kennedy-Platz. A large plaque dedicated to Kennedy is mounted on a column at the entrance of the building and the room above the entrance and overlooking the square is dedicated to Kennedy and his visit. A video of Kennedy delivering the speech plays as part of the main exhibit at the Checkpoint Charlie Museum.

The original manuscript of the speech is stored with the National Archives and Records Administration.

"I am a doughnut" confusion

There is a widespread false belief that Kennedy made an embarrassing mistake by saying Ich bin ein Berliner.  By including the indefinite article "ein," he supposedly changed the meaning of the sentence from the intended "I am a citizen of Berlin" to "I am a Berliner" (a Berliner being a type of German pastry, similar to a jam- or jelly-filled doughnut), amusing Germans throughout the city. However, this is incorrect from both a grammatical perspective and a historical perspective.

While the phrase "Ich bin ein Berliner" can be understood as having a double meaning, it is neither wrong to use it the way Kennedy did nor was it embarrassing. According to some grammar texts, the indefinite article can be omitted in German when speaking of an individual's profession or origin but is in any case used when speaking in a figurative sense. Furthermore, although the word "Berliner" has traditionally been used for a doughnut filled with fruit jam or jelly in the north, west, and southwest of Germany, it has never been used in Berlin itself or the surrounding region, where the usual word is "Pfannkuchen" (literally "pancake"). Therefore, no Berliner would mistake Berliner for a doughnut.

A further part of the misconception is that the audience to his speech laughed at his supposed error. They actually  cheered and applauded both times the phrase was used. They laughed and cheered a few seconds after the first use of the phrase when Kennedy joked with the interpreter: "I appreciate my interpreter translating my German."

The misconception appears to have originated in Len Deighton's 1983 spy novel Berlin Game, which contains the following passage, spoken by Bernard Samson:

In Deighton's novel, Samson is an unreliable narrator, and his words cannot be taken at face value. However, The New York Times''' review of Deighton's novel appeared to treat Samson's remark as factual and added the detail that Kennedy's audience found his remark funny:

Four years later, it found its way into a New York Times op-ed:

The doughnut misconception has since been repeated by media such as the BBC (by Alistair Cooke in his Letter from America program), The Guardian, MSNBC, CNN, Time magazine, and The New York Times; mentioned in several books about Germany written by English-speaking authors, including Norman Davies and Kenneth C. Davis; and used in the manual for the Speech Synthesis Markup Language. It is also mentioned in Robert Dallek's 2003 biography of Kennedy, An Unfinished Life: John F. Kennedy, 1917–1963.

Another reference to this misconception appears in David Foster Wallace's 1996 novel Infinite Jest, which contains the following passage:

In the Discworld novel Monstrous Regiment by Terry Pratchett, special envoy Sam Vimes, tasked with ending a war between the bellicose nation of Borogravia and an alliance of its aggrieved neighbours, intended to express his support for Borogravia by saying "I am a citizen of Borogravia" in its native language. However, Polly Perks, the main character, corrects him, saying he called himself a cherry pancake.

The jelly doughnut myth was largely unknown to Germans until the social web enhanced cross-cultural exchange in the 2000s. At the death of Robert Lochner in September 2003, German media retold the story on the creation of Kennedy's phrase without mentioning the myth, while on the same occasion English language media still added the myth as fact, as for example the New York Times informed by Associated Press. The German Historical Museum in Berlin opened an exhibition in 2003 without providing a hint to the myth either. The myth entered the German Wikipedia article "Ich bin Berliner" in May 2005 brought over from the English version where it had been discussed since the creation of the article in October 2001. It was already marked as an urban legend at the time in 2005. The German version settled on a section title "misconception in the english-speaking world" by January 2007. The Kennedy Museum in Berlin picked up the story in November 2008, debunking the myth, while an English article in Spiegel International about the opening of the museum in 2006 did quote the myth as fact. A reference to the myth in the national newspaper "Die Welt" as of July 2008 shows that the knowledge about the misconception in the US was well understood by then, referencing Wikipedia in the text.

See also
 Je suis CharlieReferences

Further reading
 
 Daum, Andreas (2014). "Berlin", in A Companion to John F. Kennedy, ed. Marc J. Selverstone. Malden, Mass.: Wiley Blackwell, 2014, 209–227.
 Daum, Andreas (2014). "Ich bin ein Berliner: John F. Kennedys Ansprache vor dem Schöneberger Rathaus in Berlin", in Der Sound des Jahrhunderts'', ed. Gerhard Paul and Ralph Schock. Göttingen: Wallstein, 392–396 (in German).

External links

 Who famously said "Ich bin ein Berliner" on this day in 1963?
 Text, audio, video of address
 About.com article 
 John F. Kennedy Letter On Success of Trip to Europe 1963  Shapell Manuscript Foundation
 Text: Kennedy's Berlin speech text

1963 in West Germany
1963 in international relations
1963 in politics
1963 speeches
1960s in West Berlin
June 1963 events in Europe
1963 neologisms
Berlin Wall
Cold War speeches
German words and phrases
Germany–Soviet Union relations
Germany–United States relations
United States–West Germany relations
Soviet Union–United States relations
Political catchphrases
Presidency of John F. Kennedy
Political quotes
Speeches by John F. Kennedy
Anti-communist terminology
Articles containing video clips